Alexander Luke Davies (born 23 August 1994) is an English cricketer who plays for Warwickshire. He is a right-handed batsman who also plays as a wicket-keeper. Davies was included in the England Under-19 squad for the 2012 ICC Under-19 Cricket World Cup.

In the 2017 County Championship, he became the first wicket-keeper for Lancashire to score 1,000 runs in a season.

In July 2021, it was announced that Davies would join Warwickshire ahead of the 2022 season on a 3-year deal. In the inaugural season of The Hundred, he was signed by the Southern Brave. He was the joint second highest run scorer for Southern Brave, scoring 202 runs in 10 matches. 

In February 2022, Davies was fined and banned from playing in the opening round of the 2022 County Championship over "historic offensive tweets".

In April 2022, he was bought by the Southern Brave for the 2022 season of The Hundred.

References

External links
 

1994 births
Living people
People from Darwen
English cricketers
Lancashire cricketers
Cricketers from Blackburn
North v South cricketers
Southern Brave cricketers
Wicket-keepers